Capturing Reality: The Art of Documentary is a film and website about documentary filmmaking, directed by Pepita Ferrari. Produced by the National Film Board of Canada, Capturing Reality explores the creative process of over 30 leading documentary filmmakers, combining interviews with excerpts from their films.

Production
Ferrari began work on the project in 2007. The website features four hours of additional material that does not appear in the film.

Release
The film had its world premiere at the International Documentary Film Festival Amsterdam in November 2008.

Filmmakers interviewed (in alphabetical order)

References

External links
Official site
Educational user's guide
Capturing Reality: The Art of Documentary at NFB.ca

Documentary films about films
2008 films
National Film Board of Canada documentaries
Canadian film websites
Works about documentary film
2008 documentary films
2000s Canadian films